Uzhavar Uzhaippalar Katchi (UUK) ('Farmers and Workers Party'), a political party in the Indian state of Tamil Nadu.The president of UUK is vettavalam Manikandan.

UUK supported the National Democratic Alliance in the 2001 Tamil Nadu assembly elections.

The party opposes the introduction of genetically modified rice in the agriculture of Tamil Nadu.

References

Political parties in Tamil Nadu
Political parties with year of establishment missing